Christopher Polhammar (18 December 1661 – 30 August 1751) better known as Christopher Polhem, which he took after his ennoblement in 1716, was a Swedish scientist, inventor and industrialist. He made significant contributions to the economic and industrial development of Sweden, particularly mining. He was ennobled by King Charles XII of Sweden for his contributions to Swedish technological development.

Biography
Polhem (Polhammar) was born on the island of Gotland in the village of Tingstäde, north-east of Visby.
Originally the Polhem family came from Kingdom of Hungary, of possible Austrian descent. but early,in the 14th century, intermarried in magyar nobility.

Polhem's father Wolf Christoph Polhammer, born  in Kingdom of Hungary to an baron, moved from Hungary to  Swedish Pomerania because of religious persecution. Wolf Polhammer traded with Visby. He would eventually settle down to become a skipper. They were related to Magyar nobility Szentgyörgyi of Bazin; Bora Szentgyörgyi had married Farkas Polheim 1364. There were also other families  with similar spellings in the Kingdom of Hungary among cipser-saxons who started to settle in Hungary already before 1100.
Béla Bartóks grandfather on mothers side had some zipser-saxon ancestry: the Pallheim family.

Christopher Polhammar attended a German language school in Stockholm until the age of 8 when his father died. His mother, Christina Eriksdotter Schening who was from Vadstena in Östergötland, later remarried. As a result of conflicts with his stepfather, his private tuition was no longer paid and Polhem was sent to live with his uncle in Stockholm.

He took a job as a farmhand on Vansta, a property in Södertörn, Stockholm.  Quickly, he rose to the position of supervisor, being responsible for supervision and accounting, for which he was well suited by his affinity for mathematics. He worked at Vansta for ten years, during which period he constructed a workshop where he made tools, repaired and constructed simple machinery to earn money.

Hungering for knowledge within his fields of interest, mathematics and mechanics, he soon realized that he would get no further without learning Latin. Self-studies were attempted, but given up; Polhem realized he needed a tutor. In exchange for constructing a complex clock, he was given Latin lessons by a local vicar.

Word of Polhem's mechanical skill spread quickly and a member of the clergy wrote to Anders Spole, professor of mathematics at Uppsala University to recommend Polhem. Anders Spole, grandfather of Anders Celsius, presented two broken clocks to Polhem and offered to let him study under him if he could repair them. Polhem repaired the clocks with no difficulty and in 1687,  entered the University of Uppsala at the age of 26.

Personal life
Polhem married  Maria Hoffman (1671–1735) on 28 December 1691. Together they were the parents of eight children, born between 1692 and 1705.

In 1716, he was ennobled by King Charles XII of Sweden in gratitude of his services to the nation by the king and changed his surname from Polhammar to Polheim, which he later shortened to Polhem.

He and his son  Gabriel Polhem (1700–1772) were both elected members of the Royal Swedish Academy of Sciences in 1739, the same year the Academy was founded.

Polhem died of natural causes in 1751 in Stockholm at the age of 90.

Career

Industrial 

According to Polhem's autobiography, the event that marked the beginning of his career was the successful repair of the unfinished medieval (16th century) astronomical clock designed by Petrus Astronomus at Uppsala Cathedral, which had remained unfinished and broken for more than a century.

In 1690 Polhem was appointed to improve upon the current mining operations of Sweden. His contribution was a construction for lifting and transporting ore from mines, a process that was rather risky and inefficient at the time. The construction consisted of a track system for lifting the ore, as opposed to wires; the construction was powered entirely by a water wheel. Human labor needed was limited to loading the containers. Being new and revolutionary, word of Polhem's work reached King  Charles XI of Sweden who was so impressed with the work that he assigned him to improve Sweden's main mining operation; the Falun Mine in Dalarna. 

 

Funded by the Swedish mining authority, Polhem traveled throughout Europe, studying mechanical development. He returned to Sweden in 1697 to establish laboratorium mechanicum in Stockholm, a facility for the training of engineers, as well as a laboratory for testing and exhibiting his designs. It has since become the prestigious KTH Royal Institute of Technology, whose history began with King Charles XI and his praise for Christopher Polhem for his mining efforts.

His greatest achievement was an automated factory powered entirely by water; automation was very unusual at the time. Built in 1699 in Stjärnsund, the factory produced a number of products including manufacture of knives, locks and clocks. Development of the factory was derived from the idea that Sweden should export fewer raw materials and instead process them within their own borders. 
The factory met great resistance among workers who feared they would be replaced by machinery. Eventually most of the factory was destroyed in a fire in 1734, leaving only the part of the factory that produced clocks. The factory continued producing clocks, known for their high quality and low price. Although the popularity of the clocks diminished during the beginning of the 19th century, clock-making continues to this day at Stjärnsund, still producing around twenty clocks of the Polhem design per year.

Another product from the factory was the "Polhem locks" (Swedish: Polhemslås), essentially the first design of the variation of padlocks common today. Economically, the factory was unfeasible, but the king at the time, Charles XII, was supportive and gave Polhem freedom from taxes to encourage his efforts. The factory of Stjärnsund was visited by one of his contemporaries, Carl Linnaeus, who wrote about the factory in his diaries as "Nothing is more optimistic than Stjärnsund" (Swedish: Intet är spekulativare än Stjärnsund).

Polhem also contributed to the construction of Göta Canal, a canal connecting the east and west coasts of Sweden. Together with Charles XII of Sweden, he planned the construction of parts of the canal, particularly the canal locks in the 18th century; it was not to be finished until 1832, long after his death.

Other major contributions made by Polhem were the constructions of dry docks, dams and  canal locks, which he designed together with his assistant and friend, Emanuel Swedenborg.

Other fields
Polhem was not only active within the field of mechanics, he actively wrote essays concerning medicine, social criticism, astronomy, geology and economics.

Curiosa
One ancestor to Béla Bartók, on his mothers side was Rozália Pallheim.

Notable  accomplishments
Founded Stjärnsunds manufakturverk in södra Dalarna  during 1700.
Reinvented the Cardan joint under the name of "Polhem knot" (Swedish: Polhemknut) independently of Gerolamo Cardano, the pioneer inventor.
Organized machinery into a "mechanical alphabet" and provided examples of such. Of 80 models carved in wood, 32 are still in the collections of the National Museum of Science and Technology (Swedish:Tekniska Museet) in Stockholm. Another 13 models of the "mechanical alphabet" are to be found in the Falun Mining Museum, Sweden.

Legacy
His image appeared reverse of the 500 Swedish kronor bank note which was issued between 2001 and 2016. The front featured a portrait of King Charles XI of Sweden.
 Polhem Prize (Polhemspriset) was named in his honor. The award is awarded by the Swedish Association of Graduate Engineers to significant contributors to industry and construction engineering.
 Christopher Polhem statue in bronze by Theodor Lundberg  is featured  outside the Drotten Church Ruin in Visby.
Christopher Polhem Monument in granite by Ivar Johnsson is located in Gothenburg.

See also
Emanuel Swedenborg

References

Citations

Sources 

 Johnson, William A. (1963) Christopher Polhem, The Father of Swedish Technology (Hartford, CT Trinity College Press) 
 Sorbom, Per (1985) Christopher Polhem, 1661-1751:  the Swedish Daedalus (Sveriges Tekniska Museum) 
 Orrje, Jacob (2016)  Mechanics of patronage: Christopher Polhem and the changing regimes of the Swedish state (1680-1750)  (Artefact, 4 | 135-146)

External links
 Christopher Polhem featured on the 500 Swedish kronor banknote
 Christopher Polhem  (Kanalbyggare)  
 Christopher Polhem Biography at Tekniska museet 
 Biography on the site of the town Stjärnsund 
 History of watchmaking at Stjärnsund 
 Numericana entry on Christopher Polhem  coat of arms 

1661 births
1751 deaths
People from Gotland
18th-century Swedish nobility
18th-century Swedish inventors
Swedish physicists
Uppsala University alumni
University of Harderwijk alumni
Members of the Royal Swedish Academy of Sciences
17th-century Swedish businesspeople
18th-century Swedish businesspeople
Age of Liberty people
People of the Swedish Empire
Swedish people of Hungarian descent
18th-century Swedish scientists
17th-century Swedish inventors
Swedish industrialists
18th-century industrialists